No holds barred or No Holds Barred may refer to:
 No Holds Barred (1952 film), a film starring The Bowery Boys
 No Holds Barred (1989 film), a film starring Hulk Hogan
 No Holds Barred (Biohazard album) (1997)
 No Holds Barred (Tweedy Bird Loc album) (1994)
 A 1952 episode of The Adventures of Superman
 No Holds Barred: My Life in Politics, a 1997 memoir by John Crosbie
 No Holds Barred: The Match/The Movie, a pay-per-view event produced by the World Wrestling Federation based on the 1989 film
 Catch wrestling
 Mixed martial arts
 Vale tudo